Società Sportiva Alba-Audace was an Italian football club from the Flaminio area of Rome, founded in 1907. The club is most noted for competing in the early Italian Football Championship competitions, before becoming one of three Rome based clubs merging to form AS Roma in 1927.

History
The club was founded in 1907 as Società Sportiva Alba and was owned for its known existence by Roman named Umberto Farneti. Farneti owned some land in the Flaminio area of Rome, this is where the club would play and consider their home.

During the earliest days of the Italian Football Championship, only Northern Italian football clubs gained entry into the league so Alba had to wait until 1912–13 to make their championship debut. After qualifying for the Lazio section of the championship, Alba were forced to forfeit their fixtures.

At the end of 1925–26 season, the club was forced by the Fascist Regime to absorb another Roman club, Audace Roma, but retained its colors. After only one season, Alba-Audace was merged with Roman F.C. and Fortitudo-Pro Roma S.G.S. to form A.S. Roma.

The club briefly reformed in 1945 and, after merging with Trastevere Roma, took part to the 1946–47 Serie B season as Alba Trastevere before disbanding in late 1960s.

Honours
Italian Football Championship:
Southern Champions: 1924–25; 1925–26

Historical names 

 1907 – S.S. Alba Roma (Società Sportiva Alba Roma)
 1926 – fusion with Audace Roma => U.S. Alba-Audace Roma (Unione Sportiva Alba-Audace Roma)
 1927 – folded after merging with Roman F.C. and Fortitudo-Pro Roma S.G.S.
 1930 – refounded as A.S. Alba Roma (Associazione Sportiva Alba Roma)
 1940 – A.S. Alba Motor Roma (Associazione Sportiva Alba Motor Roma)
 1942 – A.S. Alba Roma (Associazione Sportiva Alba Roma)
 1944 – Albaerotecnica Roma
 1945 – A.S. Albala Roma (Associazione Sportiva Albala Roma)
 1946 – fusion with Trastevere Roma => U.S. Albalatrastevere Roma (Unione Sportiva Albalatrastevere Roma)
 1948 – U.S. Albatrastevere Roma (Unione Sportiva Albatrastevere Roma)
 1968 – folded; refoundation of Trastevere Roma

Season-by-season record

Sources:

References

 
A.S. Roma
Defunct football clubs in Italy
Defunct football clubs in Lazio
Football clubs in Rome
Association football clubs established in 1907
Association football clubs disestablished in 1927
Association football clubs established in 1930
Association football clubs disestablished in 1968
Italian football First Division clubs
Serie B clubs
1907 establishments in Italy
1927 disestablishments in Italy
1930 establishments in Italy
1968 disestablishments in Italy